House of the Dragon is an American fantasy drama television series created by George R. R. Martin and Ryan Condal for HBO. A prequel to Game of Thrones (2011–2019), it is the second television series in the A Song of Ice and Fire franchise. Condal and Miguel Sapochnik served as the showrunners for the first season. Based on Martin's 2018 novel Fire & Blood, the series is set about 100 years after the Seven Kingdoms are united by the Targaryen Conquest, nearly 200 years before the events of Game of Thrones, and 172 years before the birth of Daenerys Targaryen. Featuring an ensemble cast, the show portrays the events leading up to the beginning of the decline of House Targaryen, a devastating war of succession known as the "Dance of the Dragons".

House of the Dragon received a straight-to-series order in October 2019, with casting beginning in July 2020 and principal photography starting in April 2021 in the United Kingdom. The series premiered on August 21, 2022, with the first season consisting of ten episodes. Five days after its premiere, the series was renewed for a second season. Sapochnik departed as showrunner after the first season, leaving Condal to serve as the sole showrunner for the second season.

The first season received highly positive reviews, with praise towards its character development, visual effects, writing, score and performances (particularly Considine, Smith, D'Arcy, Alcock, and Cooke). However, the pacing, specifically of the time jumps, and the dark lighting of some scenes were criticized. The series premiere was watched by over 10 million viewers across the linear channels and HBO Max on the first day, the biggest in HBO's history. In January 2023, the series won the Golden Globe Award for Best Television Series – Drama.

Cast and characters

Starring 
 Paddy Considine as King Viserys I Targaryen (season 1): The fifth king of the Seven Kingdoms. Known as "a warm, kind, and decent man", Viserys was chosen by a council of lords to succeed his grandfather, King Jaehaerys I Targaryen, as king. Viserys is the firstborn son of King Jaehaerys' second son Prince Baelon Targaryen and his sister-wife Princess Alyssa Targaryen.
 Matt Smith as Prince Daemon Targaryen: The younger brother of King Viserys I Targaryen and uncle / husband of Princess Rhaenyra Targaryen. Known as the "Rogue Prince" for his unpredictable behavior, Daemon is also a fierce warrior and wields the Valyrian steel sword Dark Sister. He is an experienced dragonrider who rides the dragon Caraxes, also known as the "Blood Wyrm".
 Emma D'Arcy as Princess / Queen Rhaenyra Targaryen: King Viserys I Targaryen's daughter and heir apparent, the firstborn and only surviving child of Viserys and his first wife, Queen Aemma Arryn. She was praised as the "Realm's Delight" during her youth. She is crowned queen by her supporters, the "Blacks", after her half-brother usurped the throne. She is a dragonrider who rides the dragon Syrax.
 Milly Alcock portrays young Princess Rhaenyra Targaryen (season 1).
 Rhys Ifans as Ser Otto Hightower: Queen Alicent's father and the Hand of the King to King Viserys I Targaryen's small council and continues to hold his position under King Aegon II Targaryen. When his daughter Alicent became queen, he began plotting to put her eldest son Aegon on the Iron Throne, instead of Rhaenyra.
 Steve Toussaint as Lord Corlys Velaryon, The Lord of Driftmark and head of House Velaryon, one of the wealthiest and most powerful families in the Seven Kingdoms. Known as “the Sea Snake”, he is the most famous seafarer in Westerosi history.
 Eve Best as Princess Rhaenys Targaryen: King Viserys I Targaryen's older cousin and the wife of Lord Corlys Velaryon. Rhaenys is the only child of Prince Aemon Targaryen, King Jaehaerys I Targaryen's late heir apparent and oldest son, and Jocelyn Baratheon, Jaehaerys' half-sister. Known as the "Queen Who Never Was", she was once a candidate to succeed her grandfather as ruler of the Seven Kingdoms, but was passed over in favor of her younger cousin Viserys due to her gender. She is a formidable dragonrider who rides the dragon Meleys, also known as the "Red Queen".
 Sonoya Mizuno as Mysaria: A foreign-born brothel dancer who rose to become Prince Daemon Targaryen's paramour and most trusted confidante until they eventually parted ways. She is later known as the "White Worm" and leads a network of spies throughout King's Landing.
 Fabien Frankel as Ser Criston Cole: A skilled swordsman from the Dornish Marches and the common-born son of the steward to the Lord of Blackhaven, who is hand-picked by Princess Rhaenyra to become a member of King Viserys I Targaryen's Kingsguard. He later replaces Ser Harrold Westerling as Lord Commander of the Kingsguard following the ascension of King Aegon II Targaryen.
 Olivia Cooke as Queen / Dowager Queen Alicent Hightower: Princess Rhaenyra Targaryen's childhood companion and best friend, and later the second wife and queen consort of King Viserys I Targaryen. She is raised in the Red Keep as part of the King's inner circle and is known as the most comely woman in the court.
 Emily Carey portrays young Lady / Queen Alicent Hightower (season 1).
 Graham McTavish as Ser Harrold Westerling: A seasoned knight of the Kingsguard who has served the Crown since King Jaehaerys I Targaryen. He was tasked with watching over and protecting Princess Rhaenyra Targaryen. He later replaces Ser Ryam Redwyne as the Lord Commander of the Kingsguard.
 Matthew Needham as Lord Larys Strong: The younger son of Lord Lyonel Strong, he is known as "Clubfoot" due to a birth abnormality that causes him to walk with a limp. He is Queen Alicent's trusted confidant and later serves as the Lord Confessor.
 Jefferson Hall as identical twins
 Lord Jason Lannister: The Lord of Casterly Rock, head of House Lannister and Warden of the West. An arrogant hunter and a warrior, he unsuccessfully vies for the hand of Princess Rhaenyra Targaryen.
 Ser Tyland Lannister: Lord Jason Lannister's younger twin brother and a cunning politician. He replaces Lord Corlys Velaryon as Master of Ships on King Viserys I Targaryen's small council. He later replaces Lord Lyman Beesbury as the Master of Coin following the ascension of King Aegon II Targaryen.
 Harry Collett as Prince Jacaerys "Jace" Velaryon: The firstborn son of Princess Rhaenyra Targaryen and Ser Laenor Velaryon. He is a dragonrider who rides the young dragon Vermax.
 Leo Hart portrays young Jacaerys Velaryon (recurring season 1).
 Tom Glynn-Carney as Prince / King Aegon II Targaryen: The sixth king of the Seven Kingdoms. He is the firstborn son of King Viserys I Targaryen and Queen Alicent Hightower, half-brother to Princess Rhaenyra Targaryen, husband of his sister-wife Helaena Targaryen, and father to her children Jaehaerys, Jaehaera and Maelor. Despite the best efforts of his mother, his hedonism and depravity is legendary in King's Landing's Street of Silk. He is a dragonrider who rides the young dragon Sunfyre.
 Ty Tennant portrays young Prince Aegon Targaryen (recurring season 1).
 Ewan Mitchell as Prince Aemond Targaryen: The third child and second son of King Viserys I Targaryen and Queen Alicent Hightower. He aspires to be a dragonrider and later claims the dragon Vhagar. He is known as "Aemond One-Eye" after losing his left eye in a brawl with his nephews and has grown to become a fearsome and aggressive warrior.
 Leo Ashton portrays young Prince Aemond Targaryen (recurring season 1).
 Phia Saban as Princess / Queen Helaena Targaryen: The secondborn child and only daughter of King Viserys I Targaryen and Queen Alicent Hightower, sister-wife of King Aegon II Targaryen, and mother to his children. She has a unique interest in bugs and often speaks in cryptic prophetic language. She is a dragonrider who rides the dragon Dreamfyre.
 Evie Allen portrays young Princess Helaena Targaryen (recurring season 1).
 Bethany Antonia as Lady Baela Targaryen: The elder daughter of Prince Daemon Targaryen and Lady Laena Velaryon. She is a dragonrider who rides the young dragon Moondancer.
 Shani Smethurst portrays young Baela Targaryen (recurring season 1).
 Phoebe Campbell as Lady Rhaena Targaryen: The younger daughter of Prince Daemon Targaryen and Lady Laena Velaryon. She is in possession of a dragon egg, although it has yet to hatch.
 Eva Ossei-Gerning portrays a young Rhaena Targaryen (recurring season 1).

Recurring 
 Gavin Spokes as Lord Lyonel Strong (season 1): The Lord of Harrenhal and head of House Strong, and Master of Laws on King Viserys I Targaryen's small council. He later replaces Ser Otto Hightower as the Hand of the King.
 David Horovitch as Grand Maester Mellos (season 1): A maester of the Citadel and Grand Maester on King Viserys I Targaryen's small council, as well as serving as his personal physician.
 Bill Paterson as Lord Lyman Beesbury (season 1): The Lord of Honeyholt and head of House Beesbury, and Master of Coin on King Viserys I Targaryen's small council.
 Steffan Rhodri as Lord Hobert Hightower: The Lord of Oldtown and head of House Hightower, and the older brother of Ser Otto Hightower.
 John Macmillan as Ser Laenor Velaryon: The son of Lord Corlys Velaryon and Princess Rhaenys Targaryen, and later the husband of Princess Rhaenyra Targaryen. He is a dragonrider who rides the dragon Seasmoke.
 Theo Nate portrays young Laenor Velaryon (season 1).
 Matthew Carver portrays child Laenor Velaryon (season 1).
 Nanna Blondell as Lady Laena Velaryon (season 1): The daughter of Lord Corlys Velaryon and Princess Rhaenys Targaryen, and later the second wife of Prince Daemon Targaryen. She is a dragonrider who rides the old, legendary dragon Vhagar.
 Savannah Steyn portrays a young Laena Velaryon (season 1).
 Nova Foueillis-Mosé portrays child Laena Velaryon (season 1).
 Elliott Tittensor as Ser Erryk Cargyll: The twin brother of Ser Arryk Cargyll and a member of King Viserys I Targaryen's Kingsguard and later Queen Rhaenyra Targaryen's Queensguard.
 Luke Tittensor as Ser Arryk Cargyll: The twin brother of Ser Erryk Cargyll and a member of the Kingsguard for both King Viserys I Targaryen and his successor King Aegon II Targaryen.
 Anthony Flanagan as Ser Steffon Darklyn: A member of King Viserys I Targaryen's Kingsguard and later Queen Rhaenyra Targaryen's Queensguard.
 Max Wrottesley as Ser Lorent Marbrand: A member of King Viserys I Targaryen's Kingsguard and later Queen Rhaenyra Targaryen's Queensguard.
 Ryan Corr as Ser Harwin Strong (season 1): The eldest son of Lord Lyonel Strong and heir to Harrenhal. Known as "Breakbones", he is said to be the strongest man in the Seven Kingdoms. He was Princess Rhaenyra Targaryen's secret lover and the biological father of her first three sons.
 Wil Johnson as Ser Vaemond Velaryon (season 1): The younger brother of Lord Corlys Velaryon, and a commander in the Velaryon navy.
 Kurt Egyiawan as Grand Maester Orwyle: A maester of the Citadel who replaces Mellos as Grand Maester on King Viserys I Targaryen's small council and continues to hold his position under King Aegon II Targaryen.
 Elliot Grihault as Prince Lucerys "Luke" Velaryon (season 1): The secondborn son of Princess Rhaenyra Targaryen and Ser Laenor Velaryon. He is a dragonrider who rides the young dragon Arrax.
 Harvey Sadler portrays young Lucerys Velaryon (season 1).
 Paul Kennedy as Lord Jasper Wylde: The Lord of Rain House and head of House Wylde. Known as "Ironrod", he replaces Lord Lyonel Strong as Master of Laws on King Viserys I Targaryen's small council and continues to hold his position under King Aegon II Targaryen.
 Alexis Raben as Talya (season 1): Queen Alicent Hightower's lady-in-waiting and a spy for Mysaria.
 Paul Hickey as Lord Allun Caswell (season 1): The Lord of Bitterbridge and head of House Caswell.
 Phil Daniels as Maester Gerardys: The Maester of Dragonstone.

Guests 
 Sian Brooke as Queen Aemma Arryn (season 1): The queen consort and first wife of King Viserys I Targaryen and Rhaenyra's mother. She is a granddaughter of King Jaehaerys I Targaryen through her mother, Princess Daella Targaryen, making Viserys her first cousin.
 Michael Carter as King Jaehaerys I Targaryen (season 1): The fourth king of the Seven Kingdoms. He is the grandfather of King Viserys I Targaryen, Prince Daemon Targaryen, Princess Rhaenys Targaryen and Queen Aemma Arryn. Known as the "Conciliator" or the "Old King", he ruled for over half a century and ended up outliving all his children, and eventually had to organize a great council to choose an heir from his grandchildren. He was a dragonrider and rode the dragon Vermithor.
 Garry Cooper as Ser Ryam Redwyne (season 1): The aging Lord Commander of King Viserys I Targaryen's Kingsguard.
 Julian Lewis Jones as Lord Boremund Baratheon (season 1): The Lord of Storm's End, head of House Baratheon and Lord Paramount of the Stormlands. He is also a maternal cousin of Princess Rhaenys Targaryen and is the great-grandson of house-founder Orys Baratheon, the half-brother of King Aegon the Conqueror.
 Daniel Scott-Smith as Craghas Drahar (season 1): A Myrish prince-admiral who leads the Triarchy in conquering the Stepstones, plaguing the Westerosi sea trade. He is known as the "Crabfeeder" for his practice of crucifying and feeding his captured enemies to crabs.
 Solly McLeod as Ser Joffrey Lonmouth (season 1): A knight of House Lonmouth, the battle companion and lover to Ser Laenor Velaryon.
 Rachel Redford as Lady Rhea Royce (season 1): The heir to Runestone, the seat of House Royce, and Prince Daemon Targaryen's estranged first wife.
 Owen Oakeshott as Ser Gerold Royce: A cousin of Lady Rhea Royce.
 Arty Froushan as Ser Qarl Correy (season 1): A household knight and lover of Ser Laenor Velaryon.
 Dean Nolan as Prince Reggio Haratis: The ruler of the Free City of Pentos.
 Maddie Evans as Dyana (season 1): A handmaid raped by then Prince Aegon Targaryen. 
 Roger Evans as Lord Borros Baratheon: The son of Lord Boremund Baratheon who succeeds him as Lord of Storm's End and Lord Paramount of the Stormlands.
 Nicholas Jones as Lord Bartimos Celtigar: The Lord of Claw Isle and head of House Celtigar. He is part of a council of lords and knights that support Rhaenyra's claim to the throne.

Episodes

Production

Development 

In 2015, with Game of Thrones still in production, HBO executives approached A Song of Ice and Fire writer George R. R. Martin regarding possible successors or spin-offs to the series. In November 2018, Martin stated that a "potential spin-off series would be solidly based on material in Fire & Blood." Game of Thrones creators David Benioff and D. B. Weiss stated they wanted to "move on" from the franchise and declined involvement in subsequent projects. By September 2019, a Game of Thrones prequel series from Martin and Ryan Condal that "tracks the beginning of the end for House Targaryen" was close to receiving a pilot order from HBO. The following month, House of the Dragon was given a straight-to-series order. Condal and Miguel Sapochnik, who won an Emmy Award for directing the episode "Battle of the Bastards", were selected to serve as showrunners. In 2016, Condal pitched the idea of a series based on Martin's Tales of Dunk and Egg, however HBO initially passed on it. Sapochnik was also hired to direct the series premiere as well as additional episodes. The series begins 172 years before the events of Game of Thrones during the reign of King Viserys I Targaryen, ultimately leading to the Targaryen civil war known as the Dance of the Dragons. The project is a reworking of the rejected spin-off concept from Game of Thrones writer Bryan Cogman, on which HBO officially passed.

Inspiration for the series came from English medieval history and The Anarchy, a war of succession between the Henry I of England's nephew Stephen Of Blois and the King's only surviving child, Empress Matilda, who had fled to Normandy in the 12th century. In January 2020, Casey Bloys, HBO's President of Programming, stated that writing had begun. Writers for the show include Condal and Sara Hess, who previously wrote for Deadwood and Orange Is the New Black. Martin was also involved in the pre-production, providing input on storylines and reviewed scripts and rough cuts. On August 26, 2022, less than a week after its premiere, the series was renewed for a second season. On August 31, Miguel Sapochnik stepped down as director and co-showrunner for the second season, but remained an executive producer. Sapochnik stated, "It was incredibly tough to decide to move on, but I know that it is the right choice for me, personally and professionally." Alan Taylor, who directed Game of Thrones episodes, will join in season two and serve as an executive producer and direct. Following the second season renewal, Bloys stated that the second season is expected to premiere in 2024. Hess told Variety in late December 2022 that most of the season 2 has been written and will include a revenge plot against Alicent following the events of the first season finale.

Changes from the novels 

In the novels, members of House Velaryon are generally described as having "silver-gold hair, pale skin, and violet eyes", similar to the Targaryens. However, Condal and Sapochnik wanted to introduce more racial diversity with its casting. Game of Thrones was criticized for lacking a diverse cast and including cultural stereotypes. As a result, House Velaryon are portrayed as black in the television series. According to Condal, Martin, while writing the novels, considered making the Velaryons a house of Black aristocrats who traveled to Westeros from the culturally diverse area of Valyria. Despite initial fan criticism of the ethnicity change, publications and commentators stated it helped distinguish between the large number of characters between the two families.

Fire & Blood is written in the style of a history book authored by an in-universe fictional historian studying the Targaryen dynasty and various civil conflicts. The novels of A Song of Ice and Fire, however, are more immersive, with each chapter written in a third-person limited perspective from the immediate point of view of a character. As a result, some accounts of events recorded in Fire & Blood are second-hand narrations that are potentially speculative or distorted, therefore making the narrator unreliable from the reader's perspective. In an effort to make the story more clear for viewers, the show writers decided to portray the book events in chronological order from a third-person perspective.

Casting 
Casting began in July 2020. In October 2020, Paddy Considine was cast as Viserys I Targaryen. Considine was offered a role in Game of Thrones but declined due to the fantasy elements of the series. Condal in a 2020 interview stated that Considine was their first choice for Viserys. By December, Olivia Cooke, Matt Smith, and Emma D'Arcy were cast as Alicent Hightower, Daemon Targaryen, and Rhaenyra Targaryen, respectively. In an interview with The Hollywood Reporter, Smith stated he was initially hesitant to star in a Game of Thrones prequel but accepted the role after learning of Considine's attachment to the project.

In February 2021, Rhys Ifans, Steve Toussaint, Eve Best, and Sonoya Mizuno were added to the main cast. By April, Fabien Frankel joined the cast as Ser Criston Cole. In May, Graham McTavish was spotted on set in full wardrobe. In July 2021, Emily Carey and Milly Alcock were added to the cast as younger counterparts of Alicent Hightower and Rhaenyra Targaryen, respectively. The time jump midway through the first season prompted the casting of multiple actors for the same role.

Filming 
Principal photography on the ten-episode first season of the series began in April 2021. The series was filmed primarily in the United Kingdom. House of the Dragon was the first production to be shot at Warner Bros. Leavesden Studios' new virtual production stage. On July 18, 2021, a positive COVID-19 case forced the pausing of production for two days. The Spanish publication Hoy reported that House of the Dragon would be filmed in the Province of Cáceres in western Spain between October 11–21, 2021. The provincial capital of Cáceres along with the medieval town of Trujillo were used in scenes for King's Landing. From October 26–31, the series was filmed in Portugal at the Castle of Monsanto.

Locations in Cornwall, England included St Michael's Mount, Holywell Beach and Kynance Cove. Other locations included Castleton, Derbyshire, in areas such as Cave Dale, Eldon Hill Quarry and the Market Place. Some scenes were shot in Aldershot, Hampshire. In February 2022, HBO confirmed that the first season of House of the Dragon had wrapped production. Visual effects for the series were produced in part by Pixomondo, who worked on Game of Thrones and gained an Emmy Award for Outstanding Visual Effects.

The second season is set to begin filming in spring 2023 at Warner Bros. Studios, Leavesden in Watford, England, and then will move to Cáceres, Spain. In October 2022, it was reported that the OSVP stage at Leavesden Studios, used in the series, was shutting down.

Music 

It was announced in September 2022 that Ramin Djawadi would compose the series score.
Djawadi composed the music for all eight seasons of Game of Thrones, which garnered him three Grammy Awards nominations and two Emmy Awards wins. Djawadi and the showrunners opted to retain the original theme song, "Game of Thrones Theme", for House of the Dragon. The song debuted in the opening credits of the second episode. In an interview with The A.V. Club, Djawadi stated that the original theme song was used to "tie the shows together". For the first season, Djawadi, along with Condal and Sapochnik, watched each episode and made notes on when the music should occur and what mood the music should set. Character motifs from Game of Thrones are also featured in House of the Dragon, including the Dragon theme "Dracarys".

Language 
Game of Thrones linguist David J. Peterson returned to continue his work on the constructed language High Valyrian. Peterson stated that, unlike Game of Thrones, House of the Dragon features scene-long dialogue in High Valyrian. In the series, High Valyrian is spoken by both Targaryens and Velaryons, requiring cast members to learn the language. Emma D'Arcy reportedly enjoyed learning it, while Matt Smith initially dreaded it and found it daunting.

Budget 
The production budget of the first season of House of the Dragon was nearly $200 million, which equates to under $20 million per episode. In comparison, its parent series, Game of Thrones, cost around $100 million per season, beginning with nearly $6 million per episode from seasons one to five, around $10 million for every episode in seasons six and seven, and up to $15 million each episode in its eighth and final season, earning $285 million in profits per episode over its eight seasons. According to Deadline Hollywood, the marketing budget was over $100 million, comparable to the budget for a blockbuster theatrical film.

Release 
House of the Dragon premiered on August 21, 2022. It is HBO's first new series to stream in 4K, Dolby Vision HDR and Dolby Atmos on its streaming platform HBO Max. The first episode was released for free on YouTube on September 2, 2022. The first-season finale was leaked online the week before the actual air date, with the full episode appearing on torrent sites. According to HBO, the leak came from a Europe, the Middle East and Africa partner and it will "aggressively" monitor for additional leaks.

International broadcast 

In New Zealand, the series is distributed by Sky's SoHo TV channel and Neon streaming service. In the Philippines, SKY broadcasts the show via its main cable television services and other digital streaming platforms. In India, Disney+ Hotstar distributes the show. In the UK, Ireland, Italy, Germany, Austria and Switzerland, the series airs on Sky Atlantic and its accompanying streaming service Now. In Canada, House of the Dragon is available on Bell Media's Crave streaming service and its HBO linear channel. In Australia, the series is available for streaming on Binge and Foxtel.

Home media
The first season was released on 4K UHD Blu-ray, standard Blu-ray, and DVD on December 20, 2022, and contains over an hour of behind-the-scenes features.

Reception

Critical response 

On the review aggregation website Rotten Tomatoes, the first season holds an approval rating of 93%, based on 863 reviews, with an average rating of 7.85. The website's critical consensus said, "Covering an era of tenuous peace with ferocious – albeit abbreviated – focus, House of the Dragon is an impressive prequel that exemplifies the court intrigue that distinguished its predecessor." On Metacritic, which uses a weighted average, the first season received a score of 69 out of 100 based on 43 critic reviews, indicating "generally favorable reviews".

Reviews for the first season were positive, with critics praising the writing, directing, and cast performances. Lucy Mangan of The Guardian called the show a "roaring success" with Lorraine Ali of the Los Angeles Times stating the show mirrors the acclaim of the early seasons of Game of Thrones. Reviews pointed out the reliance on Martin's novel was one of the reasons the series fared better critically than the later seasons of its predecessor, specifically the last season. The cast also received praise, with Paddy Considine, Matt Smith, Emma D'Arcy, and Olivia Cooke being singled out for their performances. In an interview with GQ, Considine stated that Martin told him that "Your Viserys is better than my Viserys". The diversity of the characters was met with praise, with Jeff Yang of The New York Times stating that diversification of the cast can help the series gain a more diverse audience. The series was included on multiple critics' top ten television series lists of 2022, including Chicago Tribune, San Francisco Chronicle, CNN, and Polygon.

Despite the praise, the show's first season did receive criticism for the depiction of violence, pacing and cinematography. Reviewing the early episodes, Rolling Stone and Entertainment Weekly said the series leaned too much on grand imagery and lacked the breakout supporting characters that Game of Thrones had. Before the premiere, Martin stated that the series is similar to a Shakespearean tragedy with each character being morally grey with no "character everybody's going to love". The Guardian stated the "dullness" of the characters makes the series more of a period drama than an action-adventure fantasy. The Los Angeles Times and The New York Times cited the constant actor changes as a reason for the lack of emotional attachment to characters. The graphic violence in the season premiere with a failed caesarean section was criticized for being excessive and, according to USA Today, "exploitive and in poor taste". The time jumps throughout the first season were also noted for being jarring and causing confusion, while George R. R. Martin defended them as being "handled very well". In addition, the dark cinematography in Episode 7 was a point of criticism from both critics and fans alike. HBO responded that the dimmed lighting in those scenes was an "intentional creative decision". Game of Thrones faced similar criticism regarding the lighting of scenes in Season 8, with one of the show's cinematographers stating it was a "deliberate choice".

Viewership 
The day after the series premiere, HBO said the episode had been viewed by an estimated 9.99 million viewers in the U.S. on its first night of availability – including linear viewers and streams on HBO Max – which HBO said was the largest single-day viewership for a series debut in the service's history, dethroning Euphoria. When renewing the show for a second season four days later, the network said the episode had been watched by over 20 million linear, streaming, and on-demand viewers in the U.S. by that point. After one week of availability, the viewership rose to nearly 25 million in the U.S. across all platforms. Internationally, the series premiere drew more than 1 million viewers when it aired on Sky Atlantic in the United Kingdom, becoming the biggest drama premiere on the channel.

According to Nielsen, the episode had a viewership of 327 million minutes or an estimated 5.03 million viewers on HBO Max in the U.S. during its first day. It later estimated that the episode was watched by 10.6 million viewers on HBO Max in the first four days, with the number increasing to 14.5 million when including the viewership on the main HBO channel. Samba TV meanwhile stated that 4.8 million U.S. households streamed the episode in the first four days.

The size of the audience during the show's premiere caused HBO Max to crash for some users, particularly those using Amazon Fire TV devices. Downdetector reported 3,700 instances of the application not responding. There were also reports of widespread streaming issues on Canadian partner service Crave. Whip Media, who track viewership data for the 22 million worldwide users of their TV Time app, stated that it was the most-viewed debut for a show in the app's history based on viewership over three days following the premiere. The series was also popular on social media, with the show premiere being the number one trending topic on Twitter and Google Trends.

The finale of the first season was watched by 9.3 million viewers across all platforms during its premiere night according to HBO, which was the highest viewership for any finale of a HBO show since the series finale of Game of Thrones. The show averaged 9–9.5 million viewers for an episode on premiere night and 29 million total viewers after a week of release.

Nielsen stated in November 2022 that 35% of the viewers of the show were in the age range of 18–34. Similar to Game of Thrones, the first season of House of the Dragon was extensively pirated. According to TorrentFreak, it was the most pirated series of 2022, beating out The Lord of the Rings: The Rings of Power and other series.

Comparisons with The Rings of Power 
Critics, fans, and publications have drawn comparisons between House of the Dragon and fantasy series The Lord of the Rings: The Rings of Power on Amazon Prime Video. The Rings of Power is a prequel series set thousands of years before the events of J. R. R. Tolkien's The Hobbit and The Lord of the Rings, while House of the Dragon is a prequel series set before Game of Thrones. The similar fantasy genre, close release dates, and extensive fan bases were cited in articles comparing the two series. Commentators and fans alike have described these comparisons as the "biggest battle in TV history". More negative criticism from the two fan bases also included the character diversity, with some publications describing some of the criticism as racist. Martin stated that although he hopes both shows are successful, he wants to see House of the Dragon "succeed more." Lindsey Weber, an executive producer for The Rings of Power, stated that the head-to-head conflict between the two shows are "totally manufactured by the media for headlines". Show co-creator J. D. Payne said the only competition he sees is with "themselves"; however, he wishes well for "anyone else working on storytelling".

Financially, the budget for The Rings of Power is almost $450 million more than House of the Dragon. Both series fared successfully in the ratings. According to Nielsen and first-party data, The Rings of Powers first two episodes had more than 1.25 billion minutes of streaming minutes after three days of availability. In comparison, a few hours after the episode two premiere of House of the Dragon, the show had reached more than 1.06 billion minutes of streaming minutes. Following the season finale for House of the Dragon, weekly streaming viewership passed 1 billion viewing minutes for the first time. According to Nielsen data, The Rings of Power has a higher percentage of older viewers, with more than 70% of viewers being over the age of 35. Following both series finales, streaming viewership for The Rings of Power decreased throughout the first season while House of the Dragon viewership increased. Despite the age gap in viewership, commentators have stated one of the reasons both shows did well was the consistent release schedule that helped create social-media buzz. Both shows have highlighted the "streaming wars" between both Amazon and HBO and the entertainment industry as a whole.

Accolades

See also 
 The novella The Princess and the Queen (2013) and its prequel The Rogue Prince (2014), both of which are authored by George R. R. Martin, later incorporated within the "Dance of the Dragons" plotline in Fire & Blood.

Footnotes

References

External links 
 
 
 

2020s American drama television series
2022 American television series debuts
American adventure television series
American epic television series
American fantasy drama television series
American fantasy television series
American prequel television series
Best Drama Series Golden Globe winners
Dark fantasy television series
Dragons in popular culture
English-language television shows
Family saga television series
Game of Thrones
HBO original programming
High fantasy television series
Incest in television
Productions using StageCraft
Serial drama television series
Television series about dragons
Television series about dysfunctional families
Television series based on American novels
Television series by Home Box Office
Television shows about death
Television shows filmed in California
Television shows filmed in Portugal
Television shows filmed in Spain
Television shows filmed in the United Kingdom
Works based on A Song of Ice and Fire